Drahouš is a municipality and village in Rakovník District in the Central Bohemian Region of the Czech Republic. It has about 70 inhabitants.

Administrative parts
The village of Tlestky and the hamlet of Svatý Hubert are administrative parts of Drahouš.

Geography
It lies in the Rakovník Uplands.

History
The first written mention of Drahouš is from 1404. Tlestky was first mentioned in 1419.

Sights
Svatý Hubert is a complex of Baroque and Neoclassical buildings with an octagonal hunting lodge from the 18th century in its centre. It was built for the Czernin family in the middle of the former fallow deer park. Near Svatý Hubert is Plaveč, a Baroque summer house that belonged to the hunting lodge.

In the centre of Drahouš is the Chapel of Saint John of Nepomuk. This Baroque chapel was rebuilt into its current form in 1852.

References

External links

Villages in Rakovník District